Chaetopappa pulchella  is a North American species of plants in the family Asteraceae. It found only in the State of (Coahuila in northern Mexico.

Chaetopappa pulchella  grows on the bottoms of canyons and ravines in the Chihuahuan Desert. It is a small plant rarely more than 7 cm (2.8 inches) tall though possessing a taproot and hence perhaps capable of surviving inhospitable seasons to act as a perennial. Flower heads have lavender ray florets and yellow disc florets.

References

pulchella
Endemic flora of Mexico
Flora of Coahuila
Flora of the Chihuahuan Desert
Plants described in 1946